Pikine is a city in the Pikine Department of the Dakar Region of Senegal.  Lying to the east of Dakar city centre, at the 2013 Census it had a population of 1,170,791.  The department includes the villages of Yeumbeul, Thiaroye, Mbao, and Keur Massar Malika.  Until the mid-2000s, it also included Guédiawaye, which now forms a separate Department.

The city was founded in 1952 by the colonial government for former residents of Dakar who were relocated for new developments.  This original city is now known as "Old Pikine", while an informal community has grown up around it.

The Grande Niaye de Pikine, a green area known for market gardening, lies to the north west of Pikine.

Notable people
Pape Cissé, footballer
Mbaye Diagne, military officer and United Nations Military observer who was credited with saving many lives during the Rwandan genocide grew up in Pikine
Aïssatou Diamanka-Besland, writer
Bamba Dieng, footballer
Cheikhou Dieng, footballer
Oumar Diouck, footballer
Amadou Hott, Minister of Economy, Planning and International Cooperation of Senegal
Andreas Manga, footballer
Momar Ndoye, footballer
Mamadou Seck, politician
Thione Seck, singer and songwriter.

Gallery

References
GeoHive: Senegal
Quartiers du Monde: Histoires Urbaines
Projet urbaDTK
RUAF Foundation: Pikine (Dakar - Senegal)

Populated places in Dakar Region
Communes of Senegal